The 2002 Australian Drivers' Championship was a CAMS sanctioned Australian motor racing title for drivers of Formula Holden racing cars with the 2002 CAMS Gold Star awarded to the winning driver. It was the 46th Australian Drivers' Championship.

The championship was won by Will Power driving a Reynard 94D for Ralt Australia.

Teams and drivers

Schedule
The championship was contested over a six-round series with two races per round:

Points system
Championship points were awarded on a 20–15–12–10–8–6–4–3–2–1 basis to the first ten finishers in each race.

Championship standings

Notes
 Points shown in the above table include minor variations from those shown in the referenced source due to mathematical errors evident in that source.
 Formula Holden regulations required cars to use an approved Holden V6 engine.

Silver Star
The Silver Star award was won by Roger Oakeshott ahead of Terry Clearihan and Rohan Carrig.

References

External links
 Race Result Archive, www.natsoft.biz
 Ralt Australia's 2002 Championship review, www.ralt.com.au, as archived at web.archive.org

Australian Drivers' Championship
Drivers' Championship
Formula Holden
Australian Drivers